Amirabad (also Romanized as Āmīrābād) is a village in Cheraghabad Rural District, Tukahur District, Minab County, Hormozgan Province, Iran. At the 2006 census, its population was 1,933, in 414 families.

References 

Populated places in Minab County